Uster Technologies, in its industry often called USTER, is a Swiss manufacturer of analytical instruments and on-line monitoring systems for the textile industry, based in Uster, Switzerland. It emerged as a management buy-out form of the textile division Zellweger Uster of the Zellweger Luwa Group in 2003. From 2007 until 2012 the company was publicly traded and listed on the main segment of SIX Swiss Exchange. Since 2012 Uster Technologies is a subsidiary of Toyota Industries Corporation.

Products and services
Uster Technologies mainly produces laboratory and on-line systems used to measure and control the quality of fibers, yarns and fabric.

For cotton ginning, classing and trading
Modern, industrial cotton gins often operate with sensors by Uster, to control their process and to the resulting fiber quality.

Cotton classing is required to measure and classify each cotton bale according to its specific physical attributes.
Measurement information produced by Uster's HVI (High Volume Instrument) covers following parameters: fiber length, length uniformity, fiber strength, fiber maturity, short fiber content, micronaire (fiber fineness), color grade, leaf and extraneous matter.

When cotton is traded, its value is determined by the above-mentioned quality parameters, as measured by the HVI in the classing agencies. Hence Uster's HVI has defined a set of standards for a large part of all cotton trades worldwide.

For yarn production
Uster products are used in the spinning mill for measuring and analyzing the quality of the raw materials (i.e., fibers of different materials), intermediate products (i.e., sliver, roving) and final product (i.e., yarn) along their entire manufacturing process.

Most important process parameters a spinning mill has to control are: quality of the incoming fibers, yarn evenness, hairiness, tensile strength and elongation, contamination with disturbing materials, twist, friction, etc. By measuring these parameters, the instruments can be used as tools for a mill-wide quality assurance process.

An overview of Uster products applied in the spinning mills:
 The "Uster Tester", a laboratory system for the measurement of evenness, thick places, thin places, neps, hairiness, diameter, dust, trash, fineness of yarns
 Yarn tensile testers - at conventional (5m/min) and high speeds (400m/min)
 Yarn fineness tester
 Yarn strength tester (Tensorapid)
 Yarn twist tester
 Yarn friction tester
 Single fiber measuring system (AFIS = Advanced Fibre Investigation System)
 Fiber bundle measuring system (HVI)
 Yarn clearer (Uster Quantum), which is mounted in the automatic winding machine, i.e., "on-line"
 Defect classification instrument (Classimat)
 Cotton cleaning system (Vision Shield)

While developing these different testing instruments, often the first of their kind, Uster also had to invent either the measuring method or the suitable measurement parameters. Some examples:

For comparing such quality parameters in the spinning laboratory with those of other spinning mills worldwide, Uster established a number of benchmarks. The first so-called "Uster Statistics" were introduced in 1957 and have been periodically updated to account for the technical and regional changes in the industry. These statistics are an important element in the trading of yarns, as they allow yarns to be objectively specified and referred to a worldwide quality level.

Uster Technologies also runs the Usterizing certification program for spinning mills.

History
 The roots of the company date back to 1875, when an aerial telegraphy workshop was established in Uster, Switzerland.
 1927, the production of weaving preparatory machines started under the brand Uster
 1944, the company started research and development for textile electronics, mainly for the Swiss spinning mills
 1948, the company launched the first ever yarn evenness tester under the name "Zellweger Uster". Being one of the first of its kind, this instrument and its following product generations became well known worldwide, which explains why the company was able to file "Uster" as a registered trademark, while being located in the city of the same name.
 1957, the company published the first set of quality standards for yarn evenness, called Uster Statistics
 1989, acquisition of Schaffner Technologies (USA)
 1990, acquisition of Spinlab (USA)
 1993, acquisition of Peyer (Switzerland)
 2003, buyout from Zellweger Luwa by Management and two private-equity investment companies
 2005, establishment of development and manufacturing site in Suzhou, China
 2006, secondary buyout by management and funds advised by Alpha Beteiligungsberatung GmbH & Co. KG
 2007, listing on main segment of SIX Swiss Exchange
 2008, introduction of new product groups specifically targeting the mid-market segment
 2009, acquisition of Zweigle products (Germany)
 2012, public takeover by Toyota Industries Corporation
 2013, acquisition of Jossi Systems
 2018, acquisition of Elbit Vision Systems (EVS)

References

External links

 Corporate web site: Uster.com
 USDA: Explanation of cotton classification data
 Cotton Incorporated: [https://web.archive.org/web/20110114234517/http://www.cottoninc.com/ClassificationofCotton/?Pg=3

Manufacturing companies of Switzerland
Companies based in the canton of Zürich
Companies established in 1875
Textile machinery manufacturers
Swiss brands
Uster